John J. McGlennon (born July 23, 1949) is an American politician of the Democratic Party, a professor at the College of William and Mary, and a member of the Board of Supervisors of James City County, Virginia.  On the board, he represents the Roberts District and once served as chairman of the board, a rotating position.  McGlennon is a native of New York, but has lived in the Commonwealth of Virginia since the 1970s.

McGlennon has been with the College of William and Mary since 1974 and served as the chairman of the Government Department from 1993 to 2003. McGlennon received his BA from Fordham University and went on to obtain both his MA and PhD from Johns Hopkins University.  He specializes in United States politics with a special focus on the South and Virginia.  He has many publications to his credit, including two books: The Life of the Parties: A Study of Presidential Activists, with Alan Abramowitz and Ronald Rapoport and Party Activists in Virginia, also with Alan Abramowitz and Ronald Rapoport.

Political career
McGlennon ran for the United States Congress as a Democrat in 1982, almost defeating the Republican incumbent, Herbert Bateman, in a year that was bad for the Republican Party nationally.  In 1984 McGlennon ran against Bateman again, but lost by a larger margin. In 1997 he was elected to the James City County Board of Supervisors and has been re-elected 6 times.

Personal life
McGlennon is married to Terry Lynne Urbanski McGlennon. John and Terry have one dog, Snowy.

Electoral History

References

1949 births
Virginia Democrats
College of William & Mary faculty
James City County, Virginia
Living people
Place of birth missing (living people)